Dance and Dancers was a magazine about ballet. The magazine was founded in 1950 by publisher Philip Dosse and editor Peter Williams.  John Percival edited the magazine from 1951 to 1995.

The publishing company, Hansom Books, folded in 1980 and the magazine was then relaunched under new management in the following year and continued publication until 1995.

References

Dance magazines
Defunct magazines published in the United Kingdom
Magazines established in 1950
Magazines disestablished in 1995
Magazines published in London
Monthly magazines published in the United Kingdom